Detroit–Shoreway is a neighborhood on the West Side of Cleveland, in the U.S. state of Ohio.  Detroit–Shoreway consists of the streets between Lake Erie and Interstate 90, from West 85th to West 45th streets.

Gordon Square

The retail hub of Detroit–Shoreway is Gordon Square, a series of retail buildings on the four corners of Detroit Avenue and West 65th Street.  Named for W.J. Gordon, considered a "city father", Gordon Square is currently the central focus of efforts to remake Detroit–Shoreway into a cultural and artistic hub for the west side, including the renovation and re-opening of the Capitol Theatre, a new building for the Near West Theatre, and renovations to the Cleveland Public Theater complex, as well as a complete rebuild of the Detroit Avenue streetscape from West 58th to West 73rd streets, including burying of utility lines.  Reinberger Auditorium houses the Talespinner Children's Theatre, a professional theater made for child audiences.  Additional plans include rebuilding the Lorain Avenue Streetscape within the Lorain Avenue Antiques District, from West 52nd to West 82nd. oWOW Radio is located at the 78th Street Studios in Gordon Square.

New developments
Detroit–Shoreway is serviced by various bus routes, and includes its own rapid transit station, West 65th–Lorain.  The Greater Cleveland Regional Transit Authority, in conjunction with the City of Cleveland and the Cleveland EcoVillage, is working on plans for transit-oriented development in the area around the station, and Detroit–Shoreway is additionally the site of a brownfield redevelopment of an old Eveready Battery Plant, known as Battery Park. The city is working with the Ohio Department of Transportation on plans to rebuild the limited access West Shoreway (SR-2) as a low-speed, 35 mph boulevard, reconnecting the long-split neighborhood with access to the lake.

Neighborhood gallery

Points of Interest
 Alternative Press Magazine (W.80th north of Lake Road)
 Capitol Theatre of the Near West Theatre (W.65th and Detroit Ave)
 Cleveland Public Theater (W.64th and Detroit Ave)
 Reinberger Auditorium houses the Talespinner Children's Theatre (W.52nd and Detroit)

References

External links

Detroit–Shoreway Neighborhood Development Organization

Neighborhoods in Cleveland
Hispanic and Latino American culture in Ohio